Feminist Media Studies is a peer-reviewed academic journal covering media and communication studies from a feminist perspective. Established in March 2001, United Kingdom publisher Routledge publishes eight issues a year. This journal advocates for original submissions based on the social experiences of society and the intersectionality of feminism. The editors-in-chief are Cynthia Carter (Cardiff University) and Isabel Molina-Guzmán (University of Illinois, Urbana-Champaign). The editorial board consists of authors and researchers from institutions around the world, including universities in the United States, the United Kingdom, the Middle East, and other universities around Asia. This academic journal provides a forum for researchers with feminist approaches to the field of communication studies. The journal has over 400,000 downloads and views each year, and invites contributions from all fields, whether related to communications or not.

Any article submitted to this journal has undergone a rigorous peer review process, being anonymously reviewed by at least two other scholars. Any researcher(s) or author(s) wanting to submit an article to Feminist Media Studies will need to submit their article on the journal's website. The latest issues of Feminist Media Studies include articles on Black feminism, social media, sexual violence, and popular shows such as "Killing Eve". The most-read articles are "Post-feminism and popular culture," and "The effect of media sexism on women's political ambition: evidence from a worldwide study."

Abstracting and indexing 
The journal is abstracted and indexed in Communication Abstracts, Communication and Mass Media Complete, Index Islamicus, International Bibliography of the Social Sciences, and the MLA International Bibliography.

References

External links 
 

Feminist journals
Media studies journals
Communication journals
Publications established in 2001
Taylor & Francis academic journals
Bimonthly journals
English-language journals